Big Springs may refer to:

Settlements in the United States
Big Springs, California
Big Springs, Indiana
Big Springs, Kansas
Big Springs, Nebraska
Big Springs, the original name of Caledonia (village), New York
Big Springs, Ohio

Bodies of water in the United States
Big Springs (Idaho)
Big Springs, an early name of the Las Vegas Springs oasis
Big Springs (California), a tributary at the source of the Owens River

See also
Big Spring (disambiguation)